Larroque is a commune in the Haute-Garonne department in southwestern France.

Population

Sights
The remains of a 12th-century castle keep, the Château de Larroque is the property of the commune. Seneschals of the counts of Foix, the chateau Larroque was retained until the fifteenth century, when it passed by marriage to the house of Foix-Rabat. The Larroque lords were co-Montmaurin country house founded with Foix (customs AWARDED 1317). They had their burial mound in the church of St. Sernin which it is believed at the base and foothills in the boundary wall of the old cemetery. Jeanne de la roque Corbeyran wife of Foix was buried about 1497. Auger de la roque was attorney of Foix in 1250, when the Viscount Nébouzan was not yet. This castle is certainly the oldest defense of Nébouzan primitive country which later became states and remained so until 1789. It has been listed since 1930 as a historic site by the French Ministry of Culture.

See also
Communes of the Haute-Garonne department

References

Communes of Haute-Garonne